Sean McColl (born 3 September 1987) is a professional rock climber from North Vancouver, Canada. He competes in the lead climbing, speed climbing, and bouldering disciplines, and has won major competitions in all three.

Biography 
Sean McColl was born on 3 September 1987 in Vancouver, Canada and lived in Chambéry, France for several years in his twenties. As of the past couple of years, he travels the world training and competing. He is sponsored by VISA, Adidas, SCARPA, Flashed Climbing, Perfect Descent, Joe Rockheads, and Vertical'Art.

Competitions 

Sean McColl found early success while training with the Canada Youth National Climbing Team. He won the gold medal in lead climbing in his age group at the 2002, 2003, and 2004 Youth World Championships. In 2006, he won in both the lead and speed climbing categories, and was beginning to break into the top 20 finishes at adult competitions. In February 2011, McColl won first place at the 12th Annual ABS Nationals bouldering competition in Boulder, Colorado.

2012 was McColl's most successful competition season to date, with 10 podium finishes at major climbing competitions. In September, McColl competed in the IFSC Climbing World Championships, where he placed second in lead climbing and fourth in bouldering. Although he did not win either event, he earned enough points to secure first place in the overall competition. Two months later, he went to the PanAmerican Championships in Venezuela. He took first place in lead climbing and second place in bouldering, making him the first Canadian athlete to reach the podium at the competition.

In May 2013, McColl earned his first Bouldering World Cup win at an event in Log Dragomer. He was the only male competitor to solve three of the four finals problems, taking first place over Jan Hojer and Dmitri Sarafutdinov. One week later, McColl took fourth place at the World Cup in Innsbruck. He placed fourth once again in June at the World Cup event in Vail.

McColl is known as a very strong athlete both in bouldering and lead. Although he was never able to win a World Championship in these individual disciplines, in 2012 he won the overall IFSC Climbing World Championships, by ranking second in lead and fourth in bouldering. From 2011 to 2014, he consistently obtained very high IFSC Climbing World Cup rankings in both disciplines. In 2014 and 2016, he won the Combined World Cup, while in 2011, 2012, 2013, and 2015 he ranked second in the Combined World Cup.

McColl won the bronze medal at The World Games 2017 in Wrocław, Poland.

McColl qualified for the olympics at the 2019 IFSC Climbing World Championships. He went on to represent Canada at the 2020 Summer Olympics, where he placed 17th in the combined competition.

Ninja Warrior
In 2014, McColl competed for Team Europe in American Ninja Warrior: USA vs. The World, and led his team to victory.  On Stage 2, McColl blew through the stage, at one point landing hard on his stomach.  During Stage 3, McColl fell on the final obstacle, just feet from the end, allowing the American team the opportunity to tie up the competition.  On stage 4, although the Americans started strong, McColl flew up the rope, beating their time by three-tenths of a second. 

In the 2018 American Ninja Warrior: USA vs. The World competition, McColl led Team Europe to the top of the podium, beating out American "Papal Ninja" Sean Bryan by approximately eight-tenths of a second.

Rankings

Climbing World Cup

Climbing World Championships 
Youth

Adult

Number of medals in the Climbing European Youth Cup

Lead

Number of medals in the Climbing World Cup

Lead

Bouldering

Notable ascents

Routes 
In September 2009, McColl claimed the second ascent of Dreamcatcher, a sport route in Squamish, British Columbia. Rated 5.14d on the Yosemite Decimal System, Dreamcatcher is considered one of the hardest climbing routes in Canada. It was first established and climbed by Chris Sharma in 2005, and was unrepeated for four years despite efforts by Ethan Pringle, Sonnie Trotter and Paul Robinson.

Boulders 
In March 2012, McColl competed in the Hueco Rock Rodeo, an annual outdoor bouldering competition in Hueco Tanks, Texas. During the competition, he completed Nagual (rated V13 on the V-scale) in one attempt, an accomplishment known as a "flash". McColl is one of few climbers to have flashed a bouldering problem with such a high degree of difficulty.

See also

List of first ascents (sport climbing)
History of rock climbing
Rankings of most career IFSC gold medals

References

External links 
 
 

 
 
 
 

1987 births
Sportspeople from Vancouver
Canadian rock climbers
Canadian expatriates in France
World Games bronze medalists
Competitors at the 2013 World Games
Competitors at the 2017 World Games
Living people
Sport climbers at the 2020 Summer Olympics
Olympic sport climbers of Canada
IFSC Climbing World Championships medalists
IFSC Climbing World Cup overall medalists
Boulder climbers